The University College of Engineering Tindivanam (UCET) is part of Anna University Chennai. It was founded in 2008. University College of Engineering Tindivanam, a constituent college of Anna University Chennai (AUC) has envisioned a wide range of improvement and development both in academics and administration since 2008. UCET was inaugurated by Dr. M. Karunanithi, the then Honorable Chief Minister of Tamil Nadu on 01-09-2008. The first-year classes for the Engineering students were initiated on 8 September 2008 in the presence of Dr. K. Ponmudy, Honorable Minister of Higher Education, Tamil Nadu. Dr. R. Raju, Special Officer of UCET campus shouldered the responsibilities of establishing the College and overseeing the growth of UCET, Tindivanam. UCET is one of the Zonal centers of AUC & AUTC. It is proposed to start Regional Research Centre at UCET.

Departments

UCET was started with four Departments. They are:

(i) Department of Civil Engineering,

(ii) Department of Computer Science and Engineering,

(iii) Department of Electronics and Communication Engineering, and

(iv) Department of Information Technology.

See also
 List of Tamil Nadu Government's Educational Institutions

References

Engineering colleges in Tamil Nadu
Colleges affiliated to Anna University
Education in Viluppuram district
2008 establishments in Tamil Nadu
Educational institutions established in 2008